W. & J. Sloane was a luxury  furniture and rug store in New York City that catered to the prominent, including the White House and the Breakers, and wealthy, including the Rockefeller, Whitney, and Vanderbilt families.

After a long period of prosperity and prominence, the firm went through a short period of decline and was forced to file for bankruptcy in 1985.

History
On March 2, 1843, the company was founded as a rug importer and seller by William Sloane, who had just emigrated from Kilmarnock, Scotland, a town famous for expensive furniture, fine carpets and rugs.  Its teak and jute resources came from East Bengal (present day Bangladesh).  In 1852, his younger brother John W. Sloane joined the firm, upon which it was renamed W. & J. Sloane, followed by William's son William Douglas Sloane. It was the first company to import oriental carpets into the United States. It soon expanded to include furniture and other home furnishings, and quickly became the choice of the elite in New York.

In the late 19th century, the company added an antiques department, started producing furniture, and became the first home furnishings store in the country, billing itself as "W. & J. Sloane Interior Decorators and Home Furnishers."  Its flagship store was originally located at Broadway and 19th Street, in "Ladies' Mile", relocating later to 414 Fifth Avenue at 38th Street, the former flagship of Franklin Simon & Co.

Taste-setter for America
In 1891, W. & J. Sloane incorporated and set the national decorating taste of the United States, and over the next sixty years decorated the homes of the most prominent people in the country, including the Breakers and the White House, created Hollywood movie sets, and even designed and decorated interiors of automobiles.  It opened a branch in San Francisco, California originally to furnish pavilions at the 1915 Panama-Pacific Exposition (it also furnished the model homes at the 1939 New York World's Fair).  It later acquired other upscale firms such as the California Furniture Company, and in 1925 a subsidiary, the Company of Master Craftsmen was founded by William Sloane Coffin Sr. (the father of Rev. William Sloane Coffin) to create colonial revival furniture.  During World War II the company worked with the Newport News Company and the North Carolina Shipbuilding Company on shipbuilding contracts for the United States Navy fitting out the interiors of liberty ships under the direction of John Sloane Griswold.

Decline and failure
In 1955, after a three-year internal struggle, control of the firm left the hands of a direct descendant of the Sloanes when Benjamin Coates, 37, was elected president.  This meant the ouster of president W.E.S. Griswold Jr. and chairman of the board John D. Sloane, both grandsons of the founders. Coates was a financier who married John D. Sloane's daughter in 1944 and served on the board. Along with the City Stores Company syndicate, he bought up 70% of the stock to win control and become head of the firm. After the store left family hands, it over-expanded and lowered the price and quality of its goods. City Stores was forced to file for bankruptcy in 1979 so that it could "continue operating while it works out a plan to pay its creditors."

It was then acquired by Hollywood-based RB Furniture in 1981. The chain closed its 38th Street store in 1984, and filed for bankruptcy on September 11, 1985. Its remaining stores were sold in 1986.

Legacy
The company generated considerable wealth for the direct descendants of William and John Sloane, who include in addition to Rev. Coffin, diplomat Cyrus Vance, attorney Cyrus Vance Jr., musical producer John H. Hammond, his son, musician John P. Hammond, and philanthropist Emily Thorn Vanderbilt Sloane.  It also brought the Sloane family into prominence in New York City, where they intermarried with the Whitneys, the Vanderbilts, and the Pynes.  Employees who worked for the firm include the American cooking icon Julia Child (then Julia McWilliams), whose first job out of Smith College in October 1935 was Assistant to the New York Advertising Manager, A. W. Forester.  Other notables include the Bevelacqua brothers: Salvatore and Aurelio, who designed under the Sloane banner before their respective success in furniture design.

References

External links

 W. & J. Sloane objects in the collection of the Cooper-Hewitt, National Design Museum
 The Story of Sloane's, 1950
 Max Walter Commercial Art for W. & J. Sloane. General Collection, Beinecke Rare Book and Manuscript Library, Yale University.

1843 establishments in New York (state)
Sloane
Retail companies disestablished in 1985
Retail companies established in 1843